Ronja Oja (born 31 July 1992) is a blind Finnish Paralympic athlete who competes in sprinting and long jump events in international level events. Her brother Jesper Oja is her running guide in track events.

References

1992 births
Living people
Sportspeople from Espoo
Paralympic athletes of Finland
Finnish female sprinters
Finnish female long jumpers
Athletes (track and field) at the 2016 Summer Paralympics
20th-century Finnish women
21st-century Finnish women